Paul Tassone (born 27 October 1969) is an Australian actor most known for his work as Nelson Curtis on All Saints, an Australian hospital drama. In late 2007–2008, he played a reverend who turned out to be a violent stalker as a result of a brain tumor on Home and Away. Tassone also starred as corrupt cop Dennis Kelly in the drama Underbelly: A Tale of Two Cities and reprised the role for the third season which is titled Underbelly: The Golden Mile. He has also had guest appearances on City Homicide and Rescue: Special Ops.

Filmography

Film

Television

Video Games

References

External links
 
 Paul Tassone at Australian Television Information Archive

Australian male television actors
Living people
1969 births
Male actors from Perth, Western Australia